DWRV (98.3 FM), broadcasting as Radio Caritas Mariae 98.3, is a non-commercial and non-profit Catholic radio station owned and operated by the Franciscans of the Immaculate under Global Broadcasting System. The station's studios and transmitter are located beside the Mary Coredemptrix Church, KM 4 Pacol Rd., Brgy. San Felipe, Naga, Camarines Sur.

References

Christian radio stations in the Philippines
Radio stations in Naga, Camarines Sur
Radio stations established in 1996